Danse Macabre is the third studio album by the rock band The Faint. It was released on August 21, 2001 in the U.S. and roughly a year later in the UK, where it has enjoyed similar popularity.

This album is the 37th release of Saddle Creek Records.

The first pressing of Danse Macabre on vinyl and CD included a different, unauthorized photo that led to them being pulled and having the covers re-printed with an image of The Faint member Dapose.

The album was followed in 2003 by the Danse Macabre Remixes.  The remix album includes mixes by Photek, Junior Sanchez and Paul Oakenfold, among others.

Track listing

Note:  The vinyl version of "Danse Macabre" moves "Violent" to track five, putting it on side 1.

Credits
Written and performed by The Faint
Gretta Cohn – cello on 3, 8, 9
Geraldine Vo – Vietnamese job list vocal and its translation on 3
Melix Severin, Gretta Cohn, Kathleen Massara – vocal atmosphere on 8
P. Anka – verse inspiration on 9
A.J. Mogis – bowed bass on 9
Original cover photo by Jim Newberry
All songs (C) Grammar Out Of Context (SESAC)
Booking: Eric Dimenstein / ground control touring
Engineered and produced by Mike Mogis and The Faint at Presto! Recording Studios, 135 S. 19th St., Lincoln, NE, 68510
Mastered by Doug Van Sloun at Studio B

References

External links
The Faint official website
Saddle Creek Records

2001 albums
The Faint albums
Saddle Creek Records albums